The 2018 Toronto mayoral election was held on Monday, October 22, 2018, to elect the Mayor of the city of Toronto. Incumbent Mayor John Tory was re-elected for a second term, defeating former Chief City Planner Jennifer Keesmaat with 63.49% of the vote. Tory won all of Toronto’s 25 wards.

Registration for candidates for the office of Mayor officially opened on May 1, 2018, and closed on July 27, 2018, at 2 pm. Incumbent John Tory has been Mayor of Toronto since being elected in 2014 and launched his bid for re-election on May 1, 2018. Former city councillor Doug Ford declared his intent to run, but later withdrew to seek the leadership of the Progressive Conservative Party of Ontario. Former Chief City Planner Jennifer Keesmaat was speculated to be considering entering the race, and after initially indicating she would not run, she announced her candidacy on July 27, 2018, the last day to register as a candidate.

Candidates 
Official registration for mayoral candidates opened May 1, 2018, and closed on July 27. At the close of nominations, 35 candidates have registered to run in the election.

Registered major candidates 

 John Tory is the incumbent Mayor of Toronto, first elected in 2014 after having lost to David Miller in 2003 and declining to run in 2010. Former CEO of Rogers Media and Rogers Cable, leader of the Progressive Conservative Party of Ontario from 2005–2009, local talk radio host, and former Canadian Football League commissioner.
 Jennifer Keesmaat was appointed Chief City Planner of Toronto by former Mayor Rob Ford in 2012, and was speculated to be considering entering politics when she left the position in 2017. An urban planner and advocate for affordable housing, she initially declined to run for mayor but announced her candidacy on July 27, 2018.

All candidates

Formerly declared candidates
Doug Ford, former city councillor and runner-up in the 2014 mayoral election, announced his intention to challenge for the office a second time at a September 2017 event. However, he announced in January 2018 that he would seek the leadership of the Progressive Conservative Party of Ontario and would not run in the mayoral election.
 Blayne Lastman, son of former mayor Mel Lastman, declared on July 25 that he would enter the race, but announced a day later that he would not run.

Declined candidates 
 Olivia Chow, placed third in the 2014 mayoral election and former MP for Trinity—Spadina.
 Desmond Cole, advocacy journalist.
 Mike Layton, city councillor for Ward 19 Trinity—Spadina (2010–present).
Sue-Ann Levy, on June 17, 2018, Levy appeared on The Rebel Media and said that she was open to the possibility of a 2018 mayoral run.
 Giorgio Mammoliti, former city councillor for Ward 7 York West (2000–2018), former MPP for Yorkview (1990–1995).
 Richard Peddie, former president and CEO of Maple Leaf Sports & Entertainment.

Debates

Opinion polls

Endorsements

Results 
Official results from the City of Toronto.

Maps

References

Toronto
Mayoral elections in Toronto
2018 in Toronto